Electrotrichogenesis (ETG) involves the stimulation of hair follicles on the scalp with the electric charge of an electrostatic field.

Three studies are listed in the PubMed database relating to the technique.

Electrotrichogenesis was approved in Europe with the CE mark, as a medical device.  It was also approved by Health Canada and the Australian health office.

References

Further reading
 
 .
 Electrotrichogenesis was also approved by KFDA (Korean Food and Drug Administration) http://www.haircell.co.kr/index.php
 Report Dr. Chu (2003) - Imperial College of Science. Technology and Medicine, Hammersmith Hospital . London (UK) https://web.archive.org/web/20151112014612/http://www.nuhairuk.co.uk/pdf/DrChu'sReport.pdf

External links
 Reuters news info on Current Technology Corporation, a company that offers electrotrichogenesis treatments.

Dermatologic procedures